Mahembea is a genus of African orb-weaver spiders containing the single species, Mahembea hewitti. It was first created by M. Grasshoff in 1970 to separate this species from its original genus, Larinia. It has only been found in Central and East Africa.

References

Araneidae
Monotypic Araneomorphae genera
Spiders of Africa